"Ride Out" is a 2015 song by Kid Ink, Tyga, Wale, YG and Rich Homie Quan from the soundtrack of Furious 7

Ride Out may also refer to:

Music
Ride Out (album), 2014 album by Bob Seger

Songs
"Ride Out", song by Chilliwack from Chilliwack
"Ride Out", song by Death in June from All Pigs Must Die
"Ride Out", song by Layzie Bone from Cleveland
"Ride Out", song by rock band Vaux from their 2003 album There Must be Some Way to Stop Them
"Ride Out", song by British artist Angel from his 2013 album About Time
"Ride Out", song by K. Michelle / Barry White
"Ride Out", song by B.G. / The Hot Boys / Lil Wayne  / Mil / Beanie Sigel Composed by J Smith / Lil Wayne Mannie Fresh production discography
"Ride Out", song by Bob Seger composed by Bob Seger from Ride Out
"Ride Out", song by Ashanti from Foolish/Unfoolish
"Ride Out", song by Mack 10 feat Chingy from Hustla's Handbook
"Ride Out", song by DJ Magic Mike
"Ride Out", song by Agallah from You Already Know
"Ride Out", song by Cassidy (rapper)
"Ride Out", song by B-Real
"Ride Out", song by Psychopathic Rydas from Ryden Dirtay
"Ride Out", song by E.S.G. from City Under Siege
"Ride Out", song by Cha Cha from Dear Diary
"Ride Out", song by Ryan Toby from Soul of a Songwriter  2006 
"Ride Out", song by Koushik from Be With
"Ride Out", song by Rey (band)
"Ride Out", song by Hussein Fatal discography
"Ride Out", song by J. Cardim
"Ride Out", song by Southern rap group 95 South from One Mo' 'Gen
"Ride Out", song by Ron Browz production discography